Alladian (Alladyan, Allagia, Allagian) is one of the Lagoon languages of Ivory Coast. It is a Kwa language, closely related to Avikam, but otherwise its position is unclear.

References

Languages of Ivory Coast
Lagoon languages